Shwe may refer to:

 Shwe language, a variety of the Palaung language
 Shwe, a subgroup of the Palaung people
 Shwe (Cyrillic), a Cyrillic letter
 Than Shwe (b. 1933), Burmese politician